Serrières is a commune in the Ardèche department in southern France.

Population

See also
Communes of the Ardèche department
List of medieval bridges in France

References

Communes of Ardèche
Ardèche communes articles needing translation from French Wikipedia